Aderemi is a surname. Notable people with the surname include:

Adesoji Aderemi (1889–1980), Nigerian politician and traditional ruler
Adewunmi Aderemi, Nigerian women's basketball coach

See also
Adeyemi

 
Surnames of Nigerian origin